Henry Nguyen (Vietnamese: Nguyễn Bảo Hoàng) (born. 1973) is a Vietnamese-American businessman, entrepreneur and venture capitalist.

Early life  

Nguyễn Bảo Hoàng's father, Tạ Quốc Dũng, was a civil engineer who held a position in the South Vietnamese government. After Saigon came under the Communist Party of Vietnam's control in 1975, he left for the United States, taking his wife, Kim Vu, their older son, Huy, daughters Thy and Linh and Henry, who was 22 months old at the time. Henry grew up in Fairfax County, VA.

Nguyen won a scholarship to attend Phillips Exeter Academy but instead attended W.T. Woodson High before attending both Harvard and, later, Northwestern University. After graduating from Harvard in 1995 he began working for Let's Go, a travel guide aimed at a student and backpacker readership. The publisher decided to do a book on Southeast Asia, and as Henry spoke Vietnamese, the editor asked him if he would go, sending Nguyen to Vietnam for the first time since he left the country as an infant. After returning, Nguyen attended Northwestern's medical school, but also enrolled in Northwestern's Kellogg Graduate School of Management in his third year, graduating in 2001 with both a medical degree and an MBA.

Career

Early career 
Nguyen worked at McDonald's in his youth in America. Nguyen's father, Bang, launched Viaworld Internet Telecommunications Corp (VITC) in 2001 in cooperation with Vietnam's state-owned telephone company, and Henry traveled to Vietnam to establish the Hanoi office, staying in Vietnam for four years.

Investment 
After meeting Patrick McGovern, the chairman of IDG Ventures, Nguyen began to run a $100 million venture capital fund for IDG as part of IDG Ventures Vietnam, which has invested in over 45 companies including VC Corporation, YAN Media Group, Vat Gia and VinaGame. The fund continues to invest in four to six companies a year.

Nguyen brought both Pizza Hut and Forbes to Vietnam. Having studied its business model as part of his master's degree, he also worked for ten years to ultimately introduce the McDonald's brand to Vietnam, where the first restaurant opened in 2014. Nguyen also serves as Chairman of Good Day Hospitality, the main franchisee for McDonald's in Vietnam.

Sport 
Nguyen leads a consortium of 22 investors who own the Los Angeles Football Club. Other members of the investment group include Peter Guber, Tom Penn, Earvin ‘Magic’ Johnson, Vincent Tan, Mia Hamm, Nomar Garciaparra, Chad Hurley and Tony Robbins. Nguyen also has interests in both Saigon Heat and the Vietnam Basketball Association.

Speaking 
In May 2018, Henry Nguyen along with Patrick Zhong, Ridwan Kamil, Noni Purnomo, were speakers on the "Innovators Who Are Changing Asia" panel of the 2018 Milken Institute Global Conference.

Personal life 

Nguyễn Bảo Hoàng is married to Nguyễn Thanh Phượng, the Chairwoman of Viet Capital Securities and daughter of former Prime Minister Nguyễn Tấn Dũng.

External links 

 IDG Profile

References 

1974 births
Living people
American investors
Harvard University alumni
Wilbert Tucker Woodson High School alumni
Kellogg School of Management alumni
Feinberg School of Medicine alumni
American venture capitalists
American people of Vietnamese descent